El vuelo de la muerte (Death Flight) is a 1934 Mexican sound black and white film directed by Guillermo Calles. It stars Sara García. It is an aviation film with melodramatic developments.

Release 
The film was released in 1935 in the United States.

Cast

 Sara Garcia
 Francisco Martínez
 Ramon Pereda 
 Luis G. Barreiro 
 Jorge Del Moral 
 Carlos L. Cabello 
 Adriana Lamar 
 Rosa Castro 
 Julio Villareal
 Pili Castellanos 
 Andrés Buchelly 
 E. Perdomo

External links
 
 El Vuelo De La Muerte, Película

1934 films
1930s Spanish-language films
Aviation films
Mexican black-and-white films
Mexican romantic drama films
1934 romantic drama films
1930s Mexican films